Trish Altass is a Canadian politician, who was elected to the Legislative Assembly of Prince Edward Island in the 2019 Prince Edward Island general election. She represents the district of Tyne Valley-Sherbrooke as a member of the Green Party of Prince Edward Island.

References 

Living people
Green Party of Prince Edward Island MLAs
Women MLAs in Prince Edward Island
21st-century Canadian politicians
Year of birth missing (living people)
21st-century Canadian women politicians